The 1972 United States presidential election in Illinois was held on November 7, 1972 as part of the 1972 United States presidential election. Incumbent President Richard Nixon won the state of Illinois with 59.03 percent of the vote, carrying the state's 26 electoral votes. He defeated his main opponent, Democratic candidate George McGovern in Illinois by a large margin of 18.52%, which still left Illinois 4.63% more Democratic than the nation.

Nixon won all but one of Illinois’ 102 counties. The solitary exception was Jackson County, home to Southern Illinois University Carbondale, which notably had voted for Nixon in the previous election and was one of only five counties outside McGovern’s home state to switch from Republican to Democratic at this election. This election is the most recent in which Cook County voted Republican, the only Republican victory in St. Clair County since Calvin Coolidge in 1924, and the last until 2016 when Alexander County supported a Republican nominee. Nixon's 2,788,179 votes is the most received by a Republican presidential candidate in the state's history. Nixon was the first Republican ever to win a majority of the vote in strongly Democratic Macoupin County, which thus meant that every antebellum free state county had, as of 1972, given a majority to a Republican presidential candidate at least once.

Primaries
The primaries and general elections coincided with those for other federal offices (Senate and House) and those for state offices.

Turnout
Turnout in the primaries was 22.54%, with a total of 1,258,713 votes cast. 

Turnout in the general election was 75.99%, with a total of 4,723,236 votes cast. State-run primaries were held for the Democratic and Republican parties on March 21.

Democratic

The 1972 Illinois Democratic presidential primary was held on March 21, 1972 in the U.S. state of Illinois as one of the Democratic Party's statewide nomination contests ahead of the 1972 presidential election.

The popular vote was a "beauty contest". Delegates were instead selected by direct-vote in each congressional districts on delegate candidates, who had either pledged to support a candidate or been uncommitted.

Republican

The 1972 Illinois Republican presidential primary was held on March 21, 1972 in the U.S. state of Illinois as one of the Republican Party's statewide nomination contests ahead of the 1972 presidential election.

In this election, all candidates were write-ins.

The popular vote was a "beauty contest". Delegates were instead selected by direct-vote in each congressional districts on delegate candidates, who had either pledged to support a candidate or been uncommitted.

General election

Results

Results by county

See also
 United States presidential elections in Illinois

Notes

References

1972 Illinois elections
Illinois
1972